Ellen Benediktson (born 25 April 1995 in Limhamn) is a Swedish singer and songwriter best known for taking part in Melodifestivalen 2014, 2015 and 2020.

Life and career
In 2013, Benediktson first garnered attention when she was the stand-in singer during the rehearsals for the Eurovision Song Contest 2013 singing France's entry "L'enfer et moi". The next year, she took part in Melodifestivalen 2014 with the song "Songbird". Benediktson placed second in the semi-final, thus making it to the final, where she placed seventh. In April 2014, Benediktson released the song "When the Sun Comes Up" as a part of a compilation album associated with the Swedish feminist political party Feminist Initiative, she is also a supporter of the left-wing party. She competed in Melodifestivalen 2015 with the song "Insomnia". She came 5th in Semi-Final 3 and was therefore knocked out of the competition. She competed in Melodifestivalen 2020 alongside Simon Peyron with the song, "Surface". They made it to the Second Chance round.

Discography

Singles

Notes

References

1995 births
Swedish electronic musicians
Swedish songwriters
People from Malmö Municipality
Living people
English-language singers from Sweden
21st-century Swedish singers
21st-century Swedish women singers
Melodifestivalen contestants of 2020
Melodifestivalen contestants of 2015
Melodifestivalen contestants of 2014